Seppe may refer to:

 Seppe Baetens (born 1989), Belgian volleyball player
 Seppe Van Holsbeke (born 1988), Belgian fencer
 Sebastian Seppe Smits (born 1991), Belgian snowboarder
 Bosschenhoofd, also known as Seppe, a village in the municipality of Halderberge, North Brabant, Netherlands
 Breda International Airport, originally named Seppe Airport, a small airport near Bosschenhoofd

See also
 Sepp (disambiguation)
 Sep (disambiguation)

Masculine given names